Chatterpaul Persaud (born 15 June 1912, date of death unknown) was a Guyanese cricketer. He played in eight first-class matches for British Guiana and Trinidad and Tobago from 1937 to 1941.

See also
 List of Guyanese representative cricketers

References

External links
 

1912 births
Year of death missing
Guyanese cricketers
Guyana cricketers
Trinidad and Tobago cricketers
Sportspeople from Georgetown, Guyana